Robert Michael Stroud (born 1942) is a British biophysicist. He was elected to the National Academy of Sciences in 2003.

Early life and education
Robert Michael Stroud was born in Stockport, England in 1942. He had an early interest in astronomy and would stargaze through his telescope in his garden. He worked with his father, an engineer, to design and build electronic devices. He attended Cambridge University where he studied in physics and mathematics, graduating in 1964. For his graduate studies he attended Birkbeck College in London, where he sat at the desk that had been Rosalind Franklin's during her time as a researcher there. His thesis concerned defining the structures of nucleosides and peptides. He discerned the crystal structure of the molecule tubercidin with non-centrosymmetric direct methods. He finished his PhD at Birkbeck in 1968.

Career
After graduating, he was offered a position at Oxford University with David Chilton Phillips, though the position's start date was delayed by a year. He undertook a postdoctoral appointment at California Institute of Technology (Caltech). He enjoyed Caltech and decided to stay on as an instructor and ultimately rejected the position at Oxford. He became an assistant professor in 1973. In 1976 he was hired at the University of California, San Francisco to help establish a program in structural biology. At UCSF he used the Pacific electric ray, a model organism, to research the acetylcholine receptor that enables rapid signaling in the nervous system. He served as the editor of the Annual Review of Biophysics and Biomolecular Structure (now the Annual Review of Biophysics) from 1994 to 2003.

Awards and honors
Stroud was elected as a member of the National Academy of Sciences in 2003 in the Biophysics and Computational Biology section.

Personal life
Stroud has an interest in music and playing instruments; his father taught him how to play his first instrument, the banjo. While attending Cambridge, Stroud played on its water polo team.

References

Living people
1942 births
English biophysicists
People from Stockport
Alumni of the University of Cambridge
Alumni of Birkbeck, University of London
California Institute of Technology faculty
University of California, San Francisco faculty
Members of the United States National Academy of Sciences
Annual Reviews (publisher) editors
Presidents of the Biophysical Society